Cornelius Walsh may refer to:
Cornelius Walsh (politician) (1817–1879), New Jersey politician
Con Walsh (1885–1961), Irish Canadian athlete
 Connie Walsh (1882–1953), Major League Baseball pitcher